The Avio Delta Thruster is a Bulgarian ultralight trike, designed and produced by Avio Design of Vetrino. The aircraft is supplied as a complete ready-to-fly-aircraft.

Design and development
It is German DULV certified and can be flown with any suitable cable-braced hang glider high-wing. The aircraft features weight-shift controls, a single-seat open cockpit, tricycle landing gear and a single engine in pusher configuration. The hang glider wing can be replaced with a paraglider wing and requires ten minutes to convert.

The aircraft is intended to be quickly folded into a package small enough to fit into a car for ground transport.

The aircraft is made from bolted-together aluminum tubing, with its single or double surface wing covered in Dacron sailcloth. A number of different hang glider and paraglider wings can be fitted to the basic carriage. A typical hang gider wing used would have a  span and would be supported by a single tube-type kingpost and use an "A" frame weight-shift control bar. The carriage front wheel is adjustable to allow for different pilot leg lengths.

The powerplant is a single cylinder, air-cooled, two-stroke,  Simonini Mini 2 engine. The fuel tank holds .

An electric version was under development in 2011.

Specifications (Delta Thruster)

References

External links

2000s Bulgarian sport aircraft
2000s Bulgarian ultralight aircraft
Single-engined pusher aircraft
Ultralight trikes
Avio Design aircraft